Microsoft for Startups, formerly known as Microsoft BizSpark, is a Microsoft program that provides support, Azure credits and free licenses to selected Microsoft products to software entrepreneurs and start ups. providing the benefits and the perks to the selected members of this program for a term of 3 years. Microsoft launched BizSpark One in 2009 as an enhanced service for selected startups. The BizSpark program was discontinued on February 14, 2018. and replaced by the Microsoft for Startups program. In October 2021 a new hub for Founders was added providing improved oversight of benefits and the startup company profile.

References

External links
Microsoft for Startups site
Microsoft for Startups Founders Hub
Microsoft BizSpark site
news report on Microsoft Malaysia investing in BizSpark
Commerce Guys wins Microsoft BizSpark start-up competition
Socmedtech Partner of Microsoft BizSpark
Microsoft BizSpark FAQ

Microsoft